Blues Cousins is a Russian blues band. Formed in 2004, they are said to be the "best Blues band in Moscow" 

 Levan Lomidze, lead singer 
 Slava Ignatov on drums
 Sergey Patrushiev on bass

CD/Albums
 The Dream (1999)
 Live 2003 
 Alive in the USA (2004)
 30 Most Slow Blues (2017)

Performances 
 “Blues Sur Seine” festival, France 
 Sunbanks Blues Festival, Washington, U.S.A.

References

External links 
 Official site
 Discography

Russian musical groups
Blues musical groups